David Newton may refer to:

 David Newton (artist) (1953–2011), American artist
 David Newton (pianist) (born 1958), Scottish jazz pianist and composer
 David Newton (guitarist), with the British band The Mighty Lemon Drops
 David George Newton (born 1935), United States Ambassador to Iraq, 1985–1988, and to Yemen, 1994–1997